Jaris is a district of the Mora canton, in the San José province of Costa Rica.

History 
Jaris was created on 18 May 2012 by Acuerdo Ejecutivo N° 0015-2012-MGP.

Geography 
Jaris has an area of  km² and an elevation of  metres.

Demographics 

For the 2011 census, Jaris had not been created as a district, there are however historic references in the censuses of 1883 (166 inhabitants) and 1892 (as Guayabo and Jaris with 868 inhabitants) to the village that would later become the socioeconomic center of the district in 2012.

Transportation

Road transportation 
The district is covered by the following road routes:
 National Route 209
 National Route 239

References 

Districts of San José Province
Populated places in San José Province